White Namibians are people of European descent settled in Namibia. The majority of White Namibians are Afrikaners (locally born or of White South African descent), with many of the White minority being German Namibians (descended from Germans who colonised Namibia in the late-nineteenth century). Many are also Portuguese or English immigrants. Current estimates of the White Namibian population run between 75,000 and 150,000. This imprecision in data is because the Namibian government no longer collects data based on race.

Distribution 
The vast majority of White Namibians live in major cities and towns in central or southern Namibia. Windhoek has by far the largest White population, and Whites are a majority in the coastal city of Swakopmund. Other coastal cities, such as Walvis Bay and Lüderitz, also have large White communities. In general, most of Namibia south of Windhoek has a high proportion of Whites, while central Namibia has a high concentration of Blacks. Apart from Windhoek, coastal areas and Southern Namibia, there are large White communities in Otjiwarongo and towns in the Otavi Triangle, such as Tsumeb and Grootfontein. The 1981 census of the Republic of South Africa reported a White  population of 76,430 in  Namibia (71% Afrikaners and 17% German-speaking).

History 

During Namibia's German rule, the colony attracted German immigrants. Most Afrikaners settled during the Dorsland Trek, as well as during the existence of apartheid. Most Angolan-born Portuguese settled after Angola became independent in 1975.

Economics
About 4,000 commercial land owners, mostly Whites, own around 50% of the arable land across the country despite a land reform process. According to the FAO, around 42% of arable land was owned by Whites at the time of independence in 1990. While the area was known as South West Africa, White Namibians enjoyed a highly privileged position due to apartheid laws enforcing strict segregation.

Politicians
 Leon Jooste, Minister of Public Enterprises
 Anton Lubowski, political activist
 Dirk Mudge, Chairman of the Turnhalle Constitutional Conference
 Henk Mudge, Member of Parliament
 Kosie Pretorius, Member of Parliament
 Hanno Rumpf, government minister and ambassador
 Hans Erik Staby, Member of Parliament
 Jan de Wet, Member of Parliament
 Piet van der Walt, Deputy Minister of National Planning
 Calle Schlettwein, Minister of Agriculture, Water and Land Reform
 Nico Smit, Member of Parliament

Businessmen
 Harold Pupkewitz

Sportspeople
 Skipper Badenhorst
 Quinton-Steele Botes
 Renaldo Bothma
 Jacques Burger
 Dan Craven
 Monica Dahl
 Trevor Dodds
 Jörg Lindemeier
 Percy Montgomery
 Oliver Risser
 Friedhelm Sack
 Manfred Starke
 Ian van Zyl

Journalists
 Gwen Lister
 Hannes Smith

Farmers
 Raimar von Hase
 Rudi and Marlice van Vuuren

Scientists
Japie van Zyl

Artists
 Tim Huebschle, film director and screenwriter
 Adolph Jentsch, painter
 Richard Pakleppa, film director and screenwriter
 EES (Eric Sell), singer, songwriter and entrepreneur
 Max Siedentopf, artist and film director

Fashion models 
 Michelle McLean 
 Behati Prinsloo 
 Chanique Rabe

Population chart

See also
 German Namibians
 Monitor Action Group
 Republican Party
 Demographics of Namibia
 History of the Jews in Namibia

References

Namibia

Namibia
Ethnic groups in Namibia
History of Namibia